Pothys is a chain of textile showrooms in South India. Originally they exclusively sold silk sarees, but today all types of garments are sold. The flagship store in Chennai is called Pothys' Palace.

History
Pothys (stylised as POTHYS) was established in 1923 by K. V. Pothy Moopanar under the name Pothy Moopanar to sell cotton sarees and dhotis woven on his own loom. K.V. Pothy Moopanar born in Srivilliputhur belongs to a heritage family of Weavers.

In 1977, his son K. V.P. Sadayandi Moopanar was able to establish the name and expand the outfit with a self-styled retail showroom at Srivilliputhur, re-christened 'POTHYS'. Their next showroom was opened in 1986 in Tirunelveli.

Pothy Moopanar's children and grandchildren run the business today.

Hurun Report ranked Sadayandi Moopanar as the 260th richest Indian with ₹2,800 crore fortune in its 2017 list.

References

Indian companies established in 1923
Retail companies established in 1923